Fuck World Trade is the second album by American punk band Leftöver Crack, released in 2004 on the Alternative Tentacles label.

The album continues the band's self-defined status as anti-racist, anti-sexist, anti-capitalist, and anarcho-communist. It also contains references to the fact that their first album was released the day of the September 11th attacks. Fuck World Trade, released through Alternative Tentacles, displays a freer approach, both lyrically and musically, than the previous work of the band,  featuring longer songs and guest appearances by Anti-Flag on "Via Sin Dios" as well as "circus-punks" The World/Inferno Friendship Society on "Soon We'll Be Dead." Despite this, it maintains the distinctive "squat-core" style members of Leftöver Crack coined to describe their previous band Choking Victim: high-speed ska mixed with thrashy punk and filled with rawly-screamed laments on and indictments of capitalism, the police, homelessness, drug addiction, and American culture. The last track Operation M.O.V.E. is a black metal influenced track about a 1985 incident in Philadelphia where police dropped a bomb on the radical African American MOVE organization, killing eleven MOVE members including five children. It also features a secret instrumental that brings the track length to over 10 minutes. The album was reissued by Fat Wreck Chords in 2015 with four previously unreleased tracks.

Critical reception
Fuck World Trade has had mixed critical reviews. Punknews.org gave the album a highly positive review, saying that "Fuck World Trade is here, and is incredible." Johnny Loftus, of Allmusic gave the album 3.5 out of 5 stars, saying that while Stza is "limited" as a vocalist, the album is still "provoking and nonconforming in double and triple amounts" and "real revolution rock."

Controversy
With the title of the album and its artwork, along with the lyrical content being highly offensive to some, the release of the album caused some controversy. The album was reportedly banned by Best Buy, Circuit City, Wal-Mart, and Music Land, among other retailers well before its release date. However, the title of the album predates the World Trade Center attacks. The phrase "Fuck World Trade" was used in a song from the pre-Leftover Crack band Choking Victim's album No Gods, No Managers (released in 1999).

Track listing

References

2004 albums
Leftöver Crack albums
Alternative Tentacles albums
Albums produced by Steve Albini